McLouth may refer to:

Places
McLouth, Kansas, a city in Jefferson County, Kansas, United States.

People
Nate McLouth (born 1981), baseball player
Lawrence Amos McLouth (1863–1927), scholar of Germanic languages and literature

Other
McLouth Steel, former integrated steel mill in Trenton, Michigan